Soroti is a city in Eastern Region of Uganda. It is the main City, commercial, and administrative center in curved out of Soroti District,  one of the nine administrative districts in the Teso sub-region. Soroti City was immediately approved for operationalization ahead of schedule by the Parliament of Uganda in the Financial Year 2020/2021

Location
Soroti City is surrounded by Soroti District, of the Teso sub-region, in the Eastern Region of Uganda, lying north Lake Kyoga. The coordinates of Soroti are 1°42'54.0"N, 33°36'40.0"E (Latitude:1.715000; Longitude:33.611111).

Population
The 1969 national population census enumerated the population of Soroti at 12,398. In 1980, the population had increased to 15,048. During the 1991 national census, Soroti's population was 40,970. In August 2014, the national population census put Soroti's population at 49,685. The Uganda Bureau of Statistics (UBOS) estimated the mid-year population of Soroti in 2020, at 60,900. The table below illustrates the data in tabular format.

Education 
Soroti hosts the main campus of Soroti University, a public institution of higher education, located in the suburb of Arapai. Soroti is also home to secondary campuses of Kumi University, and Kyambogo University. Soroti Secondary School is the biggest day school in Teso.

Transport
Soroti is connected to Mbale and Lira via the tarmacked Tororo–Mbale–Soroti Road and Soroti–Dokolo–Lira Road. The recently completed Soroti–Katakwi–Moroto–Lokitanyala Road connects the town to Moroto, in extreme northeastern Uganda. The Soroti–Amuria–Abim–Kotido Road, remains gravel surfaced, as of July 2020.

Points of interest
The following points of interest are located in Soroti or near the town limits: 1. The headquarters of Soroti District Administration 2. The offices of Soroti Town Council 3. A branch of the National Social Security Fund 4. Soroti Regional Referral Hospital, a 275-bed public hospital administered by the Uganda Ministry of Health 5. The main campus of Soroti University, a public institution of higher education 6. Teso College Aloet, an all-boys boarding secondary school 7. Lwala Soroti Hospital, a 135-bed, non-governmental hospital, administered by the Uganda Catholic Medical Bureau 8. Soroti Solar Power Station, a privately owned solar power plant with generation capacity of 10 megawatts 9. Soroti Rock, a volcanic rock formation. 10. Soroti central market 11. The headquarters of the Roman Catholic Diocese of Soroti and 12. Tororo-Lira-Kamdini Highway, which passes through the center of town in a north-west/south-east direction.

Soroti is also home to Soroti Fruit Processing Factory, a joint venture between Uganda Development Corporation and Teso Tropical Fruit Growers Cooperative Union, built with assistance from Korea International Cooperation Agency and was opened in April 2019.

See also
Teso sub-region
List of cities and towns in Uganda

References

External links

Soroti District Homepage
About Soroti District
 Soroti District named one of the poorest in Uganda As of 10 February 2009.

Populated places in Eastern Region, Uganda
 
Soroti District
Volcanoes of Uganda
Volcanic plugs of Africa